The Evangelische Verlagsanstalt (EVA) is a denominational media company founded in Berlin in 1946. The managing director is Sebastian Knöfel.

Book publisher 
The range includes numerous theological-scientific publications, religious education, congregational literature including calendars as well as Christian Belles-lettres with a focus on biographies and stories.

Newspapers and magazines 

Private radio 
The Evangelische Verlagsanstalt GmbH is a shareholder in commercial broadcasting.

History 1946–1989 
Under the licence number 54 of the Soviet Military Administration in Germany, the Evangelische Verlagsanstalt GmbH was founded in 1946 with headquarters in Berlin; in 1953 a publishing department in Leipzig was added. The first publishing director was the later  Friedrich Bartsch.

The first publication, the Christmas Carol book Ihr Kinderlein kommet, was immediately out of print despite a considerable initial print run of 28,000 copies.
In the following years, the number of publications rose steadily, so that the publishing house eventually became the largest Protestant publishing house in Germany.

Under the umbrella of the EVA, those private Protestant publishers in the GDR who had not received their own licence also published; the publishing profile was accordingly broad: from scientific theology to congregational literature, Christian fiction to Christian devotional literature and Christian calendars. Some classics are still published today, for example the Kirchliche Amtskalender or the daily  Sonne und Schild. Every book had to go through the procedure of censorship in East Germany before it was published: from appraisals by state censors to discussions with the publisher, sometimes lasting months or even years, to state paper allocation.

History since 1989 
With the Peaceful Revolution and the German reunification, the situation of EVA also changed fundamentally. After a change of shareholders, the publishing seat was moved to Leipzig in 1991. With effect from 1 January 2010, Hansisches Druck- und Verlagshaus GmbH Frankfurt (HDV) took over the majority of shares in Evangelische Verlagsanstalt GmbH Leipzig (EVA) from the previous sole shareholder, the Evangelical-Lutheran Church of Saxony (EvLKS). The EvLKS remains a shareholder in the publishing house and is the sole shareholder of Evangelisches Medienhaus GmbH Leipzig, which bundles the publishing activities of the Saxon regional church.

By the time of its 60th anniversary in 2006, around 11,000 titles had been published with a total circulation of around 150 million copies.

The publishing house is an institutional member of the Forum Thomanum.

References

External links 
 

Book publishing companies of Germany
Companies based in Leipzig
German companies established in 1946